Agatha Christie: A Life in Pictures is a 2004 BBC Television docudrama telling the life story of the British crime-writer Agatha Christie in her words.

Cast 

 Olivia Williams as Agatha Christie
 Anna Massey as older Agatha Christie
 Bonnie Wright as younger Agatha Christie
 Raymond Coulthard as Archie Christie
 Stephen Boxer as Psychiatrist
 Anthony O'Donnell as  William Kenward and Hercule Poirot
 Mark Gatiss as Kenyon
 Richard Leaf as Gunman
 Celia Montague as Clarissa Miller
 Vicki Pepperdine as Carlo Fisher
 Bertie Carvel as Max Mallowan
 Rosa Curson Smith as Rosalind
 Olivia Darnley as Nurse
 Edmund Kingsley as Soldier
 Tim McMullan as Pharmacist
 James Tucker as Reggie
 Laura Maclaine as Maid
 Gregory Finnegan as Band Member
 Cara Chase as Woman on Train

External links 
 
 

Cultural depictions of Agatha Christie
BBC television docudramas
2004 British television series debuts
2004 British television series endings
British historical television series